These are the official results of the Women's 200 metres event at the 1983 IAAF World Championships in Helsinki, Finland. There were a total number of 44 participating athletes, with six qualifying heats and the final held on Sunday 1983-08-14.

Out of the blocks, world record holder Marita Koch in lane 6 slowly made up the stagger on Merlene Ottey in lane 7.  By the time they hit the straightaway, Koch had two metres on Ottey who was about even with Florence Griffith in lane 1.  Down the straightaway, Ottey steadily ate into Koch's lead while the long striding Kathy Cook came from behind to cruise past Griffith.  Sensing the challenge from Ottey, Koch started to lean and struggle the last few steps, but realizing she had won she threw her arms up in victory.

Two years later, Koch would set the world record in the 400 metres to go along with her 200 world record.  She would retire in 1987 with both records; the 400 record has never been beaten.  Five years later, Griffith as Florence Griffith-Joyner would slice more than a second off her time to set the world record that lasts today.  6th place Grace Jackson would slice .9 off her time to finish second to Griffith-Joyner as the #9 performer of all time with Ottey a distant fourth in that race, still .2 faster than this race.  Ottey became the (at the time) #2 performer of all time in 1990.  Surpassed by Marion Jones in 1998, Dafne Schippers in 2015, Gabrielle Thomas in 2021, Elaine Thompson-Herah also in 2021 and Shericka Jackson in 2022. Ottey remains #7 on the all-time list after the longest career for an elite sprinter ever.

Medalists

Records
Existing records at the start of the event.

Final

Semifinals
Held on Saturday 1983-08-13

Quarterfinals
Held on Friday 1983-08-12

Qualifying heats
Held on Friday 1983-08-12

See also
 1980 Women's Olympic 200 metres (Moscow)
 1982 Women's European Championships 200 metres (Athens)
 1984 Women's Olympic 200 metres (Los Angeles)
 1986 Women's European Championships 200 metres (Stuttgart)
 1987 Women's World Championships 200 metres (Rome)
 1988 Women's Olympic 200 metres (Seoul)

References
 Results

 
200 metres at the World Athletics Championships
1983 in women's athletics